Eucalyptus arcana, commonly known as the Mallee manna gum  or Carpenter Rocks gum is a mallee that is endemic to South Australia. It has rough bark from the base of the trunk to the thinnest branches, lance-shaped, sometimes curved leaves, flower buds in groups of seven, white flowers and hemispherical fruit. It is only known from a single population near Carpenter Rocks.

Description
It has rough, fibrous, grey to grey-brown bark from the base of the trunk to the larger branches, and smooth, grey to cream bark on the thinnest branches. Flowering occurs in February and the flowers are white.

Taxonomy and naming
Mallee manna gum was first formally described in 1998 by Dean Nicolle and Ian Brooker who gave it the name Eucalyptus splendens subsp. arcana and published the description in the Journal of the Adelaide Botanic Gardens.<ref name=APNI1>{{cite web|title=Eucalyptus splendens subsp. arcana|url=https://id.biodiversity.org.au/instance/apni/570736|publisher=APNI|access-date=3 March 2019}}</ref> In 2009 Kevin Rule raised it to species status as E. arcana. The specific epithet (arcana) is a Latin word meaning "secret" or "mysterious", referring to the species being hidden in dense scrub.

Distribution and habitatEucalyptus arcana has a limited range and occurs on low rises in shallow, impoverished, red clay-loam soils over limestone around the coastal town of Carpenter Rocks in south-east South Australia. It is found amongst dense tall shrubland, associated with species including Eucalyptus obliqua and Eucalyptus ovata. The populations that Nicolle and Brooker described as E. splendens subsp. arcana occurring near Moonlight Head in south-west Victoria have been assessed as a form of E. aromaphloia''.

See also
List of Eucalyptus species
Carpenter Rocks Conservation Park

References

Trees of Australia
arcana
Myrtales of Australia
Flora of South Australia
Plants described in 2009